Mecistes chapuisi is a species of leaf beetle found in the Democratic Republic of the Congo, Kenya, Tanzania and Zimbabwe. It was first described by the entomologist Martin Jacoby in 1900.

References 

Eumolpinae
Beetles of Africa
Beetles of the Democratic Republic of the Congo
Taxa named by Martin Jacoby
Beetles described in 1900